Shah Turkan (13th-century) was a concubine of Iltutmish, the Mamluk ruler of the Delhi Sultanate, and the mother of his successor, Ruknuddin Firuz. 

After the death of Iltutmish, Ruknuddin indulged himself in the pursuit of pleasure and left his mother to handle the affairs of the state. Turkan had been a Turkic (enslaved) hand-maid and had risen to take control of the Sultan's harem. She took this opportunity to wreak vengeance against all those who had slighted her in the past. Consequently, Ruknuddin's rule turned unpopular and paved the way for the ascension of Razia Sultana.

References

 Delhi Sultanate
13th-century Indian Muslims
13th-century Indian people
13th-century Indian women
Spouses of sultans
Slave concubines
Indian slaves